Rugin is a village in Bajura District of the Seti Zone in northwestern Nepal. As of 1991, it has 2,105 people and 399 houses.

References

Populated places in Bajura District

rugin vdc is very far from martadi